Camera is an album by American jazz guitarist Joe Morris, which was recorded in 2010 and released on the ESP-Disk label. He leads a quartet with long-time collaborator Luther Gray on drums and a string section composed of Katt Hernandez on violin and Junko Fujiwara Simons on cello.

Reception

In his review for AllMusic, Alex Henderson states "Camera has a bit of Euro-classical appeal, but there is no overlooking the fact that this is edgy, free jazz. Morris thrives on the abstract, and he thrives on a stream of consciousness approach. But for all its intellect, Camera also has a great deal of passion."

Track listing
All compositions by Joe Morris
 "Person in a Place" – 9:39
 "Street Scene" – 7:29
 "Angle of Incidence" – 6:45
 "Evocative Shadow" – 8:05
 "Patterns on Faces" – 8:48
 "Reflected Object" – 9:43

Personnel
 Joe Morris - guitar
 Luther Gray – drums
 Katt Hernandez – violin
 Junko Fujiwara Simons – cello

References

2010 albums
Joe Morris (guitarist) albums
ESP-Disk albums